Joseph-Édouard-Émile Léonard (11 December 1872 – 15 September 1933) was a Canadian lawyer and politician.

Born in Ste-Rose, Laval County, Quebec, Léonard was educated at the Colleges of Ste Therese, Joliette and St. Mary's in Montreal. A lawyer, he was head of the Montreal firm of Leonard & Patenaude. He was the Conservative candidate in the electoral district of Laval in the general elections of 1900 but was defeated by Thomas Fortin. He was first elected to the House of Commons of Canada in a 1902 by-election, after Fortin was appointed Judge of the Superior Court of Quebec, Montreal District. He was re-elected in 1904 and was defeated in 1908 and again in 1911.

References
 
 The Canadian Parliament; biographical sketches and photo-engravures of the senators and members of the House of Commons of Canada. Being the tenth Parliament, elected 3 November 1904

1872 births
1933 deaths
Conservative Party of Canada (1867–1942) MPs
Members of the House of Commons of Canada from Quebec